Club Sportif Alliance Dudelange was a football club from Dudelange in southern Luxembourg. 

It was founded in 1916 as a merger between Étoile Rouge Dudelange (1908) and Étoile Bleue Dudelange (1912). Under German occupation in World War II, its name was changed to FV Rot-Schwarz Düdelingen as part of the Germanisation program.

The club was associated with the city's Italian community. Louis Rech, the first Luxembourgish mayor of Italian origin, was also its president.

The team had its greatest decade in the 1960s. They won back-to-back Luxembourg Cups in 1961 and 1962 runners-up in the Luxembourg National Division in the latter year, reaching a third cup final in 1969. On all these occasions, the other finalist or league champion was Union Luxembourg.

During this time, they also qualified twice for the UEFA Cup Winners' Cup. In 1961–62 they were eliminated 9–2 on aggregate in the first round by East Germany's SC Motor Jena, and a year later they fell at the same stage by the same score to B 1909 of Denmark.

In 1991, the team merged with Stade Dudelange and US Dudelange into the current F91 Dudelange. The new club inherited Alliance's place in the Luxembourg Division of Honour (second tier) as the other two entities were in the 1. Division (third).

References

1916 establishments in Luxembourg
1991 disestablishments in Luxembourg
Association football clubs established in 1916
Association football clubs disestablished in 1991
Defunct football clubs in Luxembourg
Sports teams in Dudelange
F91 Dudelange